El Puerto  is a corregimiento in Remedios District, Chiriquí Province, Panama. It was created by Law 10 of March 7, 1997; this measure was complemented by Law 5 of January 19, 1998 and Law 69 of October 28, 1998. Its population as of 2000 was 476.

References

Corregimientos of Chiriquí Province